Carol may refer to:

People with the name
Carol (given name)
Henri Carol (1910–1984), French composer and organist
Martine Carol (1920–1967), French film actress
Sue Carol (1906–1982), American actress and talent agent, wife of actor Alan Ladd

Arts, entertainment, and media

Music
 Carol (music), a festive or religious song; historically also a dance
 Christmas carol, a song sung during Christmas
 Carol (Carol Banawa album) (1997)
 Carol (Chara album) (2009)
 "Carol" (Chuck Berry song), a rock 'n roll song written and recorded by Chuck Berry in 1958
 Carol, a Japanese rock band that Eikichi Yazawa once belonged to
"The Carol", a song by Loona from HaSeul

Other uses in arts, entertainment, and media
 Carol (anime), an anime OVA featuring character designs by Yun Kouga
 Carol, the title of  a 1952 novel by Patricia Highsmith better known as The Price of Salt
 Carol (film), a 2015 British-American film starring Cate Blanchett and Rooney Mara, based on the Patricia Highsmith novel
 Carol (soundtrack), soundtrack of the 2015 film

Places
 Carol, a crater on the Moon near Ibn Firnas
 Carol City, Florida, a former census-designated place
 Carol Park, a public park in Bucharest, Romania

Other uses
 Mazda Carol, a kei car automobile
 Tropical Storm Carol, a list of tropical cyclones named Carol

See also
 
 Carole (disambiguation)
 Carrel
 Carrol
 Carroll (disambiguation)
 Carrols (disambiguation)
 Oh Carol (disambiguation)
 Karol (disambiguation)